is a Japanese anime director, and storyboard artist. He is best known for being one of the main directors on the long-running anime Case Closed, as well as the City Hunter series and Lupin III Part III.

Filmography

Anime

References

 Book references

External links
 

1949 births
Living people
Anime directors
Japanese storyboard artists